Nonja Yvonne Huberta Maria Peters is a Western Australian author and academic of Dutch ancestry.

Her books produced on migration and Dutch Australians have received wide acclaim.

She has served on a number of Australian and Western Australian bodies, as well as being head of the Curtin University Migration, Ethnicity, Refugees & Citizenship Research Unit.

Works

Depok – De droom van Cornelis Chastelein, 2019, LM Publishers Volendam,

References

External links
Stories from the sea: Nonja Peters (Western Australian Museum)

Living people
Writers from Western Australia
Historians from Western Australia
Australian anthropologists
Australian women anthropologists
Academic staff of Curtin University
University of Western Australia alumni
Recipients of the Centenary Medal
Knights of the Order of Orange-Nassau
Writers from Perth, Western Australia
People from Tilburg
Dutch emigrants to Australia
National Library of Australia Council members
Year of birth missing (living people)
People from Northam, Western Australia